Dalena is a surname. Notable people with the surname include:

Kiri Dalena (born 1975), Filipino artist, filmmaker, and human rights activist
Pete Dalena (born 1960), American baseball player

See also
Antonio D'Alena (born 1998), Italian footballer